Roel van Helden (born 2 September 1980) is a Dutch musician known mostly for his work as a drummer for German power metal band Powerwolf.

Early life 
Born in Lottum, Roel van Helden's first experience with playing drums was in a talent show at the age of 14. He attended various drum lessons with teachers such as Ivan de Jong (ex-Firewind, Torstein Olafsson (Stargazer), etc.). In addition, he played on his older brother's record, and in various local bands. He also participated in numerous TV and radio shows such as "Wet op Aan", "Niet alleen diplay", and his own show "Radio Team van Roel van Helden".

Career 
He played in DVPLO, Gramoxone, Marcel Coenen, My Favorite Scar, Subsignal, and Sun Caged. He currently plays in Powerwolf, Delphian, Lites over Fenix and System Pilot.

He joined Powerwolf replacing Tom Diener in 2011.

On 25 October 2012 he released his debut solo album RvH.

Discography 

 RvH (2012)

With Powerwolf 
 Blood of the Saints (2011)
 Preachers of the Night (2013)
 Blessed & Possessed (2015)
 The Sacrament of Sin (2018)
 Call of the Wild (2021)
 Interludium (2023)

With Delphian 
 Demo (2004)
 Oracle (2005)
 Unravel (2007)

With Lites over Fenix 
 From Dust E.P. (2008)

With DVPLO 
 Demo #1 (1998)
 Promo '98 (1998)
 Demo #2 (1999)
 Peaceful Easy End (2000)

With Subsignal 
 Beautiful & Monstrous (2009)
 Touchstones (2011)

With Sun Caged 
 Artemisia (2007)
 The Lotus Effect (2011)

References

External links 

 Official website

1980 births
Powerwolf members
Dutch heavy metal drummers
Dutch rock drummers
Male drummers
People from Horst aan de Maas
Living people